Kings' Shift (Lithuanian: Karalių Pamaina) is a 2016 Lithuanian film directed by Ignas Miškinis.

Plot
A rookie policeman is left alone in a private clinic to guard a comatose suspect of World War II war crimes. His shift is long over, yet nobody comes to replace him. However, the youngster is determined not to leave his post until he gets permission from his authorities to do so. Lack of sleep, loneliness, hunger and the persistence to serve his duty turn the young man into a ticking time bomb at the very wrong time. He must decide how far he can go guarding this suspect who is hated to death by everyone.

Cast
Vainius Sodeika as Kastytis, a policeman who is left alone in a private clinic to guard a comatose suspect of World War II war crimes.
Aistė Diržiūtė as Julija, a nurse and a granddaughter of Vytautas.
Dainius Gavenonis as a doctor.
Vidas Petkevičius as Vytautas, Julija's grandfather.
Paulius Ignatavičius as a private clinic guard.
Juozas Rapalis

References

2016 films
Lithuanian thriller films
Lithuanian-language films